Grand Duchess Alexandra (German: Großfürstin Alexandra) is a 1933 Austrian operetta film directed by Wilhelm Thiele and starring Maria Jeritza, Paul Hartmann and Leo Slezak. It is based on Franz Lehár's operetta of the same title.

The film's sets were designed by the art director Artur Berger.

Cast
 Maria Jeritza as Großfürstin Alexandra  
 Paul Hartmann as Großfürst Michael  
 Leo Slezak as Fürst Nikolai  
 Johannes Riemann as Martin Werner - Kapelmeister der Wiener Oper  
 S.Z. Sakall as Dimitri, Chefkoch im Hause der Großfürstin  
 Hans Marr as Großfürst Konstantin 
 Hans Hübner as Fürst Schirbatoff  
 Ernst Pröckl as Der rote Grenzpolizist mit Dimitri 
 Georg Antschart 
 Karl Armbruster 
 Inge List as Mädchen das in der Oper vorsingen will  
 Alexander Netschipor as Sänger  
 Johannes Roth as Der Knecht am Gut Litauen  
 Wolfgang Staudte as Einer der Flüchtlinge vor den Roten 
 Gisa Wurm as Die Wirtschafterin bei Kapelmeister Werner

References

Bibliography 
 Liora R. Halperin. Babel in Zion: Jews, Nationalism, and Language Diversity in Palestine, 1920-1948. Yale University Press, 2014.

External links 
 

1933 films
1933 musical films
Austrian musical films
Operetta films
1930s German-language films
Films directed by Wilhelm Thiele
Films set in Russia
Films set in Vienna
Films set in the 1910s
American black-and-white films